{{Speciesbox
| taxon = Conus echinophilus
| image =Conus echinophilus 1.jpg
| image2 =Conus echinophilus 2.jpg
| image_caption =Apertural and abapertural views of shell of Conus echinophilus Petuch, E.J., 1975
| status = EN
| status_system = IUCN3.1 
| status_ref = 
| authority =  (Petuch, 1975)
| synonyms_ref = 
| synonyms = 
 Africonus echinophilus Petuch, 1975
 Lautoconus echinophilus (Petuch, 1975) 
 Conus (Lautoconus) echinophilus (Petuch, 1975)  (alternate representation)
| display_parents = 3
}}Conus echinophilus is a species of sea snail, a marine gastropod mollusk in the family Conidae, the cone snails and their allies.Recognized in Lautoconus and not as Africonus in: Tucker J.K. & Tenorio M.J. (2009) Systematic classification of Recent and fossil conoidean gastropods. Hackenheim: Conchbooks. 296 pp.

Like all species within the genus Conus, these snails are predatory and venomous. They are capable of "stinging" humans, therefore live ones should be handled carefully or not at all.

Description
The size of the shell varies between 8 mm and 24 mm.

Distribution
This species occurs in the Atlantic Ocean off Senegal, Africa.

References

 Tucker J.K. & Tenorio M.J. (2009) Systematic classification of Recent and fossil conoidean gastropods''. Hackenheim: Conchbooks. 296 pp.
  Puillandre N., Duda T.F., Meyer C., Olivera B.M. & Bouchet P. (2015). One, four or 100 genera? A new classification of the cone snails. Journal of Molluscan Studies. 81: 1–23

External links
 The Conus Biodiversity website
 
 Checklist of the Living Conidae, Paul Kersten: 
 Cone Shells – Knights of the Sea

echinophilus
Molluscs of the Atlantic Ocean
Molluscs of Africa
Endemic fauna of Senegal
Gastropods described in 1975